The Bishop of Cork, Cloyne and Ross is the Church of Ireland Ordinary of the united Diocese of Cork, Cloyne and Ross in the Province of Dublin.

The current bishop is the Right Reverend Paul Colton BCL, DipTh, MPhil, LLM, PhD. He was consecrated bishop at Christ Church Cathedral, Dublin, on Thursday 25 March 1999; the Feast of the Annunciation. He was enthroned in St. Fin Barre's Cathedral, Cork on 24 April 1999, in St Colman's Cathedral, Cloyne on 13 May 1999, and in St. Fachtna's Cathedral, Ross on 28 May 1999.

Succession
This bishop is successor to the Bishop of Cork (from 876), Bishop of Cloyne (from 887) and Bishop of Ross (from 1160, and distinct from the Scottish Bishop of Ross). They were combined to establish the Bishop of Cork and Ross (from 1583) and the current position Bishop of Cork, Cloyne and Ross (from 1835).

List of bishops

References

External links 
 Official Website

Cork, Cloyne and Ross
Religion in County Cork
Bishops of Cork, Cloyne and Ross
Bishops of Cork or Cloyne or of Ross